The 2013–14 Mid-American Conference women's basketball season began with practices in October 2013, followed by the start of the 2013–14 NCAA Division I women's basketball season in November. Conference play began in January 2014 and concluded in March 2014. Bowling Green won the regular season title with a record of 17–1 by one game over Central Michigan. Crystal Bradford of Central Michigan was named MAC player of the year.

Third seeded Akron won the MAC tournament over fifth seeded Ball State. Rachel Tecca of Akron was the tournament MVP. Akron lost to Purdue in the first round of the NCAA tournament. Bowling Green, Central Michigan and Ball State played in the WNIT.

Preseason awards
The preseason coaches' poll and league awards were announced by the league office on October 29, 2013.

Preseason women's basketball coaches poll
(First place votes in parenthesis)

East Division
  (9)
  (3)
 
 
 Ohio

West Division
  (12)

Tournament champs
Central Michigan (9), Akron (1), Bowling Green (1), Miami (1)

Honors

Postseason

Mid–American tournament

NCAA tournament

Women's National Invitational Tournament

Postseason awards

Coach of the Year: Jennifer Roos, Bowling Green
Player of the Year: Crystal Bradford, Central Michigan
Freshman of the Year: Cha Sweeney, Eastern Michigan
Defensive Player of the Year: Crystal Bradford, Central Michigan
Sixth Man of the Year: Taylor Johnson, Central Michigan

Honors

See also
2013–14 Mid-American Conference men's basketball season

References